The  Mountaintop Ministries Worldwide, formerly known as Meade Ministries and before that as End Time Ministries, was a cult founded by Charles Meade and was located in Columbia County, Florida, just south of Lake City, Florida.

With its roots starting in many "house churches" across 14 states during the 1970s and 1980s,  Meade preached a message about living a life above sin and abstaining from all worldly trends/ideas. If one was to follow these simple beliefs then God, in turn, would bless them "beyond measure." This ideology was very attractive to the 1970s college populace, from whom Meade would build his church.

Starting in the late 80s, Meade started proclaiming that Florida was going to be the location of the movement's headquarters. Lake City, Florida was dubbed "The Promised Land" and over the ensuing years most if not all the members residing in those 14 states had moved to that sleepy town in north Florida. However, moving to this land came with disastrous requirements. Members now were told that any family or friends that did not move were now part of the sinful world and were immediately shunned and cut off. For the next 25 years there was little to no contact with any "outsiders."

Church membership grew to over 2,000 by the mid-2000s and with the building of a massive state of the art church this group and gotten the attention of multiple national news agencies.

Meade Ministries became even more closed and closeted. Members which didn't give enough money were shunned, those that attended sports games were kicked out, movies and board games were trashed... The church had developed into a cult.

In April 2010, the founder Charles Meade died in a VA hospital from medical complications at the age of 93. His wife Marlene assumed control of the church.

Marlene Meade acted as head from 2010 until her removal in 2011.

Meade's grandson James assumed control and implemented a series of changes immediately. The only rule was there were no rules. Outreach programs were established, families were reunited after 30 years and members were welcomed back.

At this time the name was changed to Mountaintop Ministries in an attempt to rebrand and alienate the cult-like rules that were in the organization's history. Three satellite churches were opened in Mexico, membership doubled, fundraisers brought in over $2 Million dollars in 2014.

In December 2015, scandal hit the church. Multiple women accused Charles Meade of having sexual intercourse with them as minors well into the age of adulthood. investigations proved these accusations to be true. Upon finding this out, members demanded that more light was to be shed upon the church's leadership and its operations. Whistleblowers disclosed financial misconduct among the self-appointed board of directors. The funds raised in the year prior had been used to fuel an excessive and lavish lifestyle and falsified outreach missions that were secret casino and strip club vacations for church leadership. An outraged congregation, tore into the past 40 years of church propaganda finding lies and mass manipulation. This all culminated into a "final" church service where enraged members called out leadership and after 3 hours of deliberation, over 1,200 members left the church for good.

The church "closed" then changed its name to Christian Fellowship church. It is now run by a small group of Meade's former followers, who are still attempting to right all the wrong that was done in the churches past 50 years.

Location
The worship center was built in the mid-1990s with seating for over 2000. The church was located on County Road 240 near Columbia City.

The church was listed as Non-Denominational / Independent by USA Churches.

References 

Churches in Columbia County, Florida
1990s establishments in Florida